The women's freestyle 51 kilograms is a competition featured at the 2000 World Wrestling Championships, and was held at the Universiada Hall in Sofia, Bulgaria from 1 to 3 September 2000.

Results

Preliminary round

Pool 1

Pool 2

Pool 3

Pool 4

Pool 5

Knockout round

References

Women's freestyle 51 kg